Sergio Francisco Ramos (born 19 May 1979), known as Sergio Francisco, is a Spanish former professional footballer who played as a striker, currently manager of Real Sociedad B.

Playing career
Born in Irun, Gipuzkoa, Sergio Francisco spent the vast majority of his 15-year senior career in the lower leagues, amassing Segunda División B totals of 254 games and 74 goals for four teams. He represented mainly local Real Unión.

Sergio Francisco's input at the professional level consisted of 51 matches in Segunda División with SD Eibar, Gimnàstic de Tarragona and Real Unión, and four in La Liga with another Basque side, Real Sociedad. His debut in the latter competition took place on 17 September 2000, as he came on as a second-half substitute for Edgaras Jankauskas in a 4–1 away loss against RC Celta de Vigo.

Coaching career
Having suffered an anterior cruciate ligament injury in September 2008, Sergio Francisco retired at the end of the 2010–11 season, aged 32. He joined his main club's coaching staff the following year, under Imanol Idiakez, becoming head coach subsequently with Unión competing in the third tier.

On 5 June 2014, after leading the side to the 15th place in division three, Sergio Francisco was fired. He was appointed at Real Sociedad C in 2017, achieving promotion to the newly-created Segunda División RFEF at the end of the 2020–21 campaign.

On 31 May 2022, Francisco was named manager of Real Sociedad's reserves, recently relegated to the Primera Federación, in place of the departed Xabi Alonso.

Managerial statistics

References

External links

1979 births
Living people
Sportspeople from Irun
Spanish footballers
Footballers from the Basque Country (autonomous community)
Association football forwards
La Liga players
Segunda División players
Segunda División B players
Tercera División players
Real Sociedad B footballers
Real Sociedad footballers
SD Eibar footballers
Real Unión footballers
Zamora CF footballers
Lorca Deportiva CF footballers
Gimnàstic de Tarragona footballers
Sestao River footballers
CD Laudio players
Spanish football managers
Segunda División B managers
Tercera División managers
Primera Federación managers
Segunda Federación managers
Real Unión managers
Real Sociedad B managers